A by-election was held for the New South Wales Legislative Assembly electorate of Cootamundra on 28 July 1906 because of the resignation of William Holman. John Norton blamed Holman for a series of articles in The Worker commenting on Norton's unnatural silence over the land scandals involving Paddy Crick and William Willis. Norton made a personal attack on Holman in parliament, challenging him to resign and both would contest Holman's seat of Cootamundra.

The Surry Hills by-election was held the previous week. John Norton was a candidate, however he was defeated and withdrew from the contest for Cootamundra. H. V. Evatt argues that the most likely explanation for Norton's attack was to remove Labour's best debater at a critical time.

Dates

Result

John Norton challenged William Holman to resign and both would contest Holman's seat of Cootamundra.

See also
Electoral results for the district of Cootamundra
List of New South Wales state by-elections

Notes

References

1906 elections in Australia
New South Wales state by-elections
1900s in New South Wales